Around the World in a Day is the seventh studio album by American recording artist Prince, and the second release where his backing band The Revolution is billed. It was released on April 22, 1985, by Paisley Park Records and Warner Bros. Records. Departing somewhat from the commercial sound of his previous release, the massively successful Purple Rain (1984), the album instead saw Prince experimenting with psychedelic styles and more opulent textures. In compliance with Prince's wishes, the record company released the album with minimal publicity, withholding accompanying singles until almost a month after the album's release.

Around the World in a Day was released to notably mixed reception among crossover audiences after the success of Purple Rain, though it nonetheless sold relatively well and became Prince and the Revolution's second number-one album on the Billboard 200. Two of its four singles reached the top 10 of the Billboard Hot 100: "Raspberry Beret" and "Pop Life". Following Prince's death, "Raspberry Beret" re-charted on the Billboard Hot 100 as a top 40 hit, reaching number 33. Around the World in a Day was certified double platinum by the Recording Industry Association of America (RIAA) on July 2, 1985.

Background
Recording for Around the World in a Day was begun in sessions dating back before that of Purple Rain. Following six months of touring behind that bestselling album, Prince returned to recording. An initial inspiration for the album's sound came in the form of a demo, recorded by David Coleman, the brother of Revolution band member Lisa Coleman, which would ultimately become the title track.

The album pursued a dense, psychedelic style that made use of unconventional instruments and cryptic lyrics. Its sound and album cover painting by Doug Henders (artist) drew numerous comparisons to The Beatles' Sgt. Pepper's Lonely Hearts Club Band album. Prince spoke in an interview about the album's cover art, its psychedelic sound, and the comparison:

"The influence wasn't the Beatles. They were great for what they did, but I don't know how that would hang today. The cover art came about because I thought people were tired of looking at me. Who wants another picture of him? I would only want so many pictures of my woman, then I would want the real thing. What would be a little more happening than just another picture would be if there was some way I could materialize in people's cribs when they play the record. I don't mind [the album being called psychedelic], because that was the only period in recent history that delivered songs and colors. Led Zeppelin, for example, would make you feel differently on each song."

Reception

Despite the muted promotion and the material on the album being overall not as radio-friendly as Purple Rain, it still had two American top 10 hits, and went double platinum. It was initially met with mixed critical reception.

According to Prince, George Clinton was a fan of the album.

In a positive retrospective review for Pitchfork, Alan Light described the album as "a brave and deeply personal project, exploring sounds and ideas that were almost shocking coming from a pop icon at his peak."

Simon Price wrote for The Guardian that the album "always sounds better than you think it will, when you revisit."

Track listing
{{Track listing
| headline = Side one<ref name="Princevault">{{cite web|author=Prince and the Revolution|url=https://princevault.com/index.php?title=Album:_Around_The_World_In_A_Day|title=Around The World In A Day"|publisher=Prince Vault|date=Feb 13, 2023}}</ref>
| title1 = Around the World in a Day
| writer1 = Prince, John L. Nelson, David Coleman
| length1 = 3:28
| title2 = Paisley Park
| writer2 = Prince
| length2 = 4:42
| title3 = Condition of the Heart
| writer3 = Prince
| length3 = 6:48
| title4 = Raspberry Beret
| writer4 = Prince
| length4 = 3:33
| title5 = Tamborine
| writer5 = Prince
| length5 = 2:47
}}

 Personnel 
Information taken from the Prince Vault website.

 Musicians 
 Prince – lead vocals and various instruments
 David Coleman – cello (1, 4, 8), oud (1), finger cymbals (1), darbuka (1), background vocals (1)
 Jonathan Melvoin – tamborine (1), background vocals (1, 7)
 Wendy Melvoin – background vocals (1, 2, 4, 6, 7), guitars (6–8)
 Lisa Coleman – background vocals (1, 2, 4, 6, 7), keyboards (6–8)
 Susannah Melvoin – background vocals (1, 2, 4)
 Novi Novog – violin (2, 4)
 Bobby Z. – drums and percussion (6–8)
 Brown Mark – bass guitar and background vocals (6–8)
 Dr. Fink – keyboards (6–8)
 Brad Marsh – tamborine (6)
 Sheila E. – drums (7)
 Eddie M. – saxophone (8, 9)
 Suzie Katayama – cello (4, 8)
 Sid Page – violin (8)
 Marcy Dicterow-Vaj – violin (8) (as "Vaj")
 Denyse Buffum – viola (8)
 Laury Woods – viola (8)
 Tim Barr – stand-up bass (8)
 Annette Atkinson – stand-up bass (8)
 Taja Sevelle – background vocals (8)

 Production 
 Prince - producer, arranger and engineer
 David Leonard - engineer (Flying Cloud Drive Warehouse and Capitol Records)
 Peggy McCreary - engineer (as "Peggy Mac", Flying Cloud Drive Warehouse and Sunset Sound)
 David Tickle - engineer (Mobile Audio)
 Susan Rogers - engineer (2)
 Bernie Grundman - mastering
 Laura LiPuma - design and assembly
 Doug Henders - cover painting
 Cavallo, Ruffalo and Fargnoli - management
 Moultrie Accountancy - accounting

Charts

Weekly charts

Year-end charts

Singles
 "Raspberry Beret" (#2 US, #4 US R&B, #25 UK)
 "Raspberry Beret"
 "She's Always in My Hair" (US)
 "Hello" (UK)

 "Paisley Park" (#18 UK) No US release "Paisley Park"
 "She's Always in My Hair"

 "Pop Life" (#7 US, #8 US R&B, #60 UK)
 "Pop Life"
 "Hello" (US)
 "Girl" (UK)

 "America" (#46 US, #35 US R&B) No UK release "America"
 "Girl"

 Certifications 

References

External links
 Around The World In A Day at Discogs
 Around The World In A Day'' at Prince Vault

1985 albums
Prince (musician) albums
Albums produced by Prince (musician)
Paisley Park Records albums
Warner Records albums
Albums recorded at Sunset Sound Recorders